Anthene licates  or White Ciliate Blue is a butterfly in the family Lycaenidae. It is found in South-east Asia.

Subspecies
A. l. licates (Sulawesi, Banggai)
A. l. addenda (Fruhstorfer, 1916) (Palawan)
A. l. dusuntua Corbet, 1940 (Peninsular Malaya, Langkawi, possibly Borneo, Sumatra)
A. l. philetas (Fruhstorfer, 1916) (possibly Bachan, Obi, Arfak Peninsula, West Irian: Kapaur)

References

Butterflies described in 1874
Anthene
Butterflies of Asia
Taxa named by William Chapman Hewitson